The Saponi is a Native American tribe historically based in the Piedmont of North Carolina and Virginia. They spoke a Siouan language, related to the languages of the Tutelo, Biloxi, and Ofo.

They were part of the Monacan confederacies. Saponi, Tutelo, and Yesang were collectively called the Nahyssan. The Cayuga adopted the Saponi into the League of the Haudenosaunee in 1753, and some Saponi descendants are part of the Cayuga Nation.

Name  
The origin and meaning of Saponi, sometimes spelled Sappony, is debated. American anthropologist John Reed Swanton wrote that Saponi was "a corruption of Monasiccapano or Monasukapanough." He wrote the name came from moni-seep meaning "shallow water." University of Kansas linguist Robert L. Rankin also suggested that their name derived from sa:p moni meaning "shallow water" or sa:p oni: meaning "shallow tree."

Ethnographer James Mooney suggested the word might come from the Siouan term sapa meaning "black."

German explorer John Lederer suggested their name came from Sepy, a female immortal in their religion. He wrote that either four tribes or clans were named for this spirit and three other closely related female spirits from whom the Saponi believed they descended. Evidence came from a short list of names given by the missionary Samuel Kirkland.

Language 
The Saponi language, now extinct, was a Siouan language, closely related to Tulelo.

The Saponi dialect is known from only two sources. One is a word list of 46 terms and phrases recorded by John Fontaine at Fort Christanna in 1716.  This contains a number of items showing it to be virtually the same language as recorded by Hale. The other source is William Byrd II's History of the Dividing Line betwixt Virginia and North Carolina (1728), in which he recorded the names of some local creeks. Byrd's scant list has been found to have included several names from unrelated Indian tribes.

By the time linguistic data was recorded, many related eastern Siouan tribes had settled together at Fort Christanna in Brunswick County, Virginia, where the colonists sometimes referred to them as the Christanna Indians. In 1870, philologist Horatio Hale recorded an elder Nikonha's information about the Tutelo language in Brantford, Ontario.

Territory 
At the time of European contact up to the early 18th century, the Saponi lived in present-day Virginia and North Carolina. Their settlements extended into the New River in West Virginia. In the 17th and 18th centuries, some Saponi settled along the Roanoke River, its tributary the Staunton River, and the Yadkin River. Lands in the Virginia Piedmont were dominated by oak, hickory, and pine forests. In the mid-18th century, most surviving Saponi migrated to Pennsylvania and New York.

Their primary town was called Saponi. In 1670 Lederer visited their nearby settlement, Pintahae, near present-day Lynchburg, Virginia.

Culture 
The Saponi are an Eastern Sioan people with a matrilineal society. They had settled villages and built houses of post-and-pole frames with central hearths. In the 17th century, men wore breechclouts and women wore deerhide aprons. Important leaders, such as medicine men, wore feather cloaks. British explorer John Lawson wrote that the Saponi were governed by a headman, an elders' council, and, when necessary, a war chief.

Historically, Saponi people hunted deer, bear, beaver, squirrel, turkey, and other fowl. They may have hunted woodland bison and elk. They fished in rivers and the Atlantic Ocean. They farmed maize, beans, and squash and harvest wild plants including various nuts, berries, and stone fruits. Chiefs used staffs of hickory wood.

History

17th century 
In 1600, James Mooney estimated there were 2,700 Saponi. English explorer Edward Bland wrote in 1650 about the "Occononacheans and Nessoneicks" living on Roanoke River. The "Nessoneicks" were Saponi. In 1670, John Lederer visited what he described as "Sapon, a Village of the Nahyssans," who were the Saponi. Lederer wrote about the Saponi: "The nation is governed by an absolute Moarch; the People of a high stature, warlike and rich."

In 1671 Thomas Batts and Robert Fallam led an expedition that passed through several Saponi villages. After their visit, the Saponi and Tutelo moved downriver and settled with Occaneechi people. Nathanial Bacon led an attack against the tribes in 1676. This move was likely to avoid increasing attacks from Haudenosaunee people.

Nearly decimated, the Saponi relocated to three islands at the confluence of the Dan and Staunton rivers in Clarksville with their allies, the Occaneechi, Tutelo, and Nahyssans.

In 1677, the Virginia colonial government named the Saponi as tributary Indians under the colonial governor's protection.

18th century 
English explorer John Lawson wrote about the Saponi in 1701. He noted they fought against the Seneca and trapped beaver for the fur trade. Shortly after his visit, the Saponi migrated to North Carolina. A band of Saponi returned to Virginia in 1708. There Occaneechi and Stukanox joined them. 

By 1701, the Saponi and allied tribes, often collectively referred to as Nahyssan, Saponi, or Tutelo, had begun moving to the location of present-day Salisbury, North Carolina to gain distance from the colonial frontier. By 1711 they were just east of the Roanoke River and west of modern Windsor, North Carolina. In 1712, they asked Virginia to prohibit alcohol sales in their settlement.

In 1714, Alexander Spotswood, governor of the Colony of Virginia, resettled them in an Indian Reservation at Fort Christanna near Gholsonville, Virginia. The tribes agreed to this for protection from hostile Haudenosaunee. In 1716, the combined Saponi, Tutelo, and Manahoac population at the reservation was 200. Although in 1718 the House of Burgesses voted to abandon the fort and school, the Siouan tribes continued to stay in that area for some time. They gradually moved away in small groups over the years 1730 to 1750. One record from 1728 indicated that Colonel William Byrd II made a survey of the border between Virginia and North Carolina, guided by Ned Bearskin, a Saponi hunter. Byrd noted several abandoned fields of corn, indicating serious disturbance among the local tribes.

Hostilities between the Haudenosaunee and the Saponi and their neighbors ceased with the signing of the 1722 Treaty of Albany.

In 1740, the majority of the Saponi and Tutelo moved to Shamokin in Pennsylvania. In 1753, the Cayuga people adopted them into their nation during the Grand Council of the Haudenosaunee. In 1711 the majority of Saponi migrated with the Cayuga to near Ithaca, New York, while some remained in Pennsylvania until 1778.

A band with 28 adult Saponi remained near Granville County, North Carolina until 1755.

In 1765, Saponi settled at Tioga Point, where the Chemung River joins the Susquehanna River in north-central Pennsylvania. They also settled as Pony Hollow, just southwest of Newfield, New York, which connected to other Nahyssan and Haudenosaunee communities nearby. "Pony Hollow" is a corruption of Saponi Hollow. An estimated 30 Saponi warriors lived among these communities. 

Shortly after the American Revolutionary War, Samuel Kirkland noted a community of them living near Fort Niagara who was later believed to have joined the Mohawk, whereas others continued into Canada alongside the Cayuga. Since most of the Iroquois sided with the British in the American Revolutionary War, after the victory by the United States, the Saponi and Tutelo who had joined the Iroquois were forced with them into exile in Canada. After that point, recorded history was silent about the tribe.

Americans destroyed Saponi communities in Pennsylvania and New York in 1779. In 1779, most of the Saponi were driven to Fort Niagara, where the Saponi separated from the Tutelo, who migrated north to Ontario, Canada. Those Saponi settled in Seneca County, New York in 1780. and they were forced to cede their lands to the state of New York in 1789, but some remained in the Cayuga homelands.

Distinct from the Person County Indians, a group of Saponi who remained in North Carolina merged with the Tuscarora, Meherrin, and Machapunga and migrated north into New York with them by 1802.

State-recognized tribes 
North Carolina has three state-recognized tribes that identify as descendants of the historical Saponi people. None of these organizations are federally recognized as a Native American tribe.

They are:
 Haliwa-Saponi Indian Tribe, based in Halifax and Warren counties
 Occaneechi Band of the Saponi Nation, based in Mebane, North Carolina, organized in 1984 as the Eno-Occaneechi Indian Association, added Saponi to its name in 1995, state-recognized in 2002
 Sappony, based in Roxboro, North Carolina,  recognized by North Carolina in 1911 as the Indians of Person County. In 2003 they changed their name to Sappony.

Unrecognized organizations 
Numerous unrecognized tribes and other organizations claim Saponi ancestry. These include the Mahenips Band of the Saponi Nation of Missouri in the Ozark Hills, with headquarters in West Plains, Missouri. In 2000, the Saponi Nation of Missouri submitted a letter of intent to Petition for Federal Acknowledgement of Existence as an Indian Tribe; however, they did not follow through with submitting a petition.

Ohio is home to the second-largest population of people who claim Saponi ancestry. Ohio has no federally recognized or state-recognized tribes. Director of the Haliwa-Saponi Historic Legacy Project, Dr. Marty Richardson wrote, "A large group of Meadows Indians migrated to Ohio after 1835 and took advantage of fewer race-based restrictions." However, 1818 to 1842 marked Indian removals in Ohio. In 1998, a group called Saponi Nation of Ohio submitted a letter of intent to petition for recognition; however, they never submitted a completed petition.

See also
 Catawba
 Cheraw
 Moneton
 Mosopelea
 Sewee
 Waccamaw

Notes

References 
 Demallie, Raymond J., "Tutelo and Neighboring Groups," in Handbook of North American Indians, Volume 14: Southeast, ed. Raymond D. Fogelson (Washington, DC: Smithsonian Institution, 2004), 286–300.

External links
 Saponi Indians, North Carolina History Project
 Cayuga Nation, official website
 Haliwa-Saponi Indian Tribe, state-recognized tribe in North Carolina
 Occaneechi Band of the Saponi Nation, state-recognized tribe in North Carolina
 Sappony, state-recognized tribe in North Carolina

Siouan peoples
Indigenous peoples of the Northeastern Woodlands
African–Native American relations
Cayuga
Native American history of New York (state)
Native American history of North Carolina
Native American history of Pennsylvania
Native American history of Virginia
Native American tribes in North Carolina
Native American tribes in Virginia
State-recognized tribes in the United States